Kalish may refer to:
Kalish (Farscape), a fictional humanoid species
Kalush, Ukraine or Kalish, Ukraine
Kalish, a color in the ultraviolet range seen by Klingons in the Star Trek novel Pawns and Symbols

People with the surname Kalish
 Bruce Kalish, American television writer
 Donald Kalish, American logician and pacifist
 Gilbert Kalish, American pianist
 Israel Yitzhak Kalish, the first Hasidic Rebbe of Warka
 Jake Kalish (born 1991), American baseball player
 Ken Kalish, videogames writer
 Ryan Kalish, American major league baseball player
 Shaindel Kalish, American actress
 Shimon Sholom Kalish, the Hasidic Rebbe of Amshinov–Otvotsk
 Dudi Kalish, Hasidic Jewish singer; see Shloime Gertner
 Sophie Tucker, singer, comedian, actress, radio personality

See also 
 Kalisch (disambiguation)
 Kalisz (disambiguation)

Slavic-language surnames
Jewish surnames